Andrew Tsirindonis is a former boxer who competed in the 1938 British Empire Games in Sydney, Australia, representing Southern Rhodesia. He won bronze in the welterweight division after winning his bronze medal fight over Norman Dawson of Canada. Previously, Tsirindonis defeated Jack Hahn of South Africa in a quarter-final contest before losing his semi-final bout to Darcy Heeney of New Zealand.

See also 
 Commonwealth Games

References

Possibly living people
White Rhodesian people
Welterweight boxers
Rhodesian male boxers
Boxers at the 1938 British Empire Games
Commonwealth Games bronze medallists for Southern Rhodesia
Commonwealth Games medallists in boxing
Rhodesian people of Greek descent
Medallists at the 1938 British Empire Games